Raseen Mohammed Imam is a Sri Lankan politician and former Member of Parliament.

Imam was a National List MP for the Tamil National Alliance (TNA) in the Sri Lankan Parliament between February 2008 and February 2010, having taken over from M.K. Eelaventhan MP, who was expelled from Parliament in December 2007.

Imam was not selected as a TNA candidate for the 2010 parliamentary election.

References

Sri Lankan Tamil people
Sri Lankan Muslims
Members of the 13th Parliament of Sri Lanka
Tamil National Alliance politicians
Living people
Year of birth missing (living people)